Lady Eileen "Bundle" Brent is a fictional character of two of the Agatha Christie novels, The Secret of Chimneys (1925) and The Seven Dials Mystery (1929), described as a spirited "it girl".

Family
Bundle was the eldest daughter of Clement Edward Alistair Brent, 9th Marquess of Caterham (simply called "Lord Caterham"). She had two sisters, Daisy and Dulcie. She described her late mother as having “got tired of having nothing but girls and died". Her mother "thought someone else could take on the job of providing an heir”. Bundle’s uncle, the 8th Marquess, was Foreign Secretary in the British Government (a circumstance possibly suggested by Marquess Curzon of Kedleston's having held that post from 1919–24).

The Brents' seat was Chimneys, a country house based on Abney Hall, Cheshire. The family’s residual links with the Foreign Office, including the presumption, resented by the 9th Marquess, that the house would continue to be available for purposes of state, as it had been when his late brother was in Government, were an important ingredient of the two Chimneys novels.

Character
Bundle’s age is not explicitly given in either novel, but in The Secret of Chimneys, Bundle describes an incident that took place seven years before and says: "One of the footmen told me when I was twelve years old", which makes her 19 years old. That would be consistent with ages given or hazarded for characters whom readers would assume were, broadly speaking, her contemporaries. As a child she was "long-legged" and "impish", growing into a “tall, dark” adult with an “attractive boyish face”. She was resourceful, headstrong, vivacious and charming, with sharp, penetrative grey eyes that could be disconcerting to others.

"Simply it"
Bundle was very much a young woman of her times, with many of the characteristics of a "flapper". Drawing on terminology made popular by the It (1927 film), Bill Eversleigh, one of the characters of The Seven Dials Mystery who had a crush on her, remarked to a colleague, "Don't you know Bundle? Where have you been vegetating? She's simply it". When Bundle's father, with whom she clearly had a strong bond, observed that "you modern young people seem to have such unpleasant ideas about love-making", she attributed this to her having read The Sheik ("Desert love. Throw her about, etc."), the novel by Edith Maude Hull (1919) on which Rudolph Valentino's celebrated film of 1921 was based.

Bundle owned a Hispano-Suiza car, though the model is not identified. On her own admission, she tended to drive too fast and some, including Lord Caterham, were “terrified” of her driving. On one occasion, she thought that she had run a man down, whereas in fact he had already been shot dead. Although her attitude to politics and politicians was somewhat ambiguous, she claimed to be a socialist and indeed was described by her father as "a red hot socialist if she’s anything at all".

Suitors
Bundle was attractive to men. Towards the end of The Seven Dials Mystery, she received two proposals of marriage, the first from George Lomax, a pompous cabinet minister, only five years younger than her father, who was known behind his back as "codders" (alluding to his eyes) and was described incongruously as "His Majesty's permanent [sic] Under Secretary of State for Foreign Affairs". Lomax's unctuous self-assessment of his suitability as a husband, and of the role he saw for Bundle, had much in common with Mr Collins' unsuccessful wooing of Elizabeth Bennet in Jane Austen's Pride and Prejudice (1813). Lomax was duly rejected and Bundle opted instead for Bill Eversleigh (born c. 1900), one of Lomax's junior officials, described four years earlier as "very likeable" with a "pleasantly ugly face". Eversleigh plainly loved Bundle for herself, and he was acceptable to Lord Caterham because he was a scratch golfer. In The Seven Dials Mystery, Bundle told Superintendent Battle of Scotland Yard, who appeared in both of the Chimneys novels, that he was a "wonderful man" and that she was sorry he was already married.

Appearances

Novels 

The Secret of Chimneys and The Seven Dials Mystery were published (and explicitly set) four years apart. The intervening period was momentous for Agatha Christie herself. The Secret of Chimneys, which concerned the future of the Herzoslovakian royal family and their jewels, was widely regarded as the best of her earlier novels, but marked the end of her association with the publisher Bodley Head. In 1926 she went missing for eleven days, ending up in an hotel in Harrogate, some two hundred miles from her home in Berkshire, and in 1928 she was divorced from her first husband.

In The Seven Dials Mystery, Bundle turned to amateur sleuthing after the death of two Foreign Office officials, both house guests of the Coote family, who had been renting Chimneys. She was drawn, with a male companion, to a secret society in the Seven Dials district of London, in effect competing with Superintendent Battle to get to the bottom of a sinister intrigue. According to her biographer, Christie played around with names and characters when drafting the story, although she always intended it to be a vehicle for the energetic young woman she had introduced in The Secret of Chimneys.

There were subtle differences between the Bundle of 1925 and that of 1929. Despite such consistent traits as her fast driving, she was seen as more mature in the second novel. For example, Lomax, who, in The Secret of Chimneys had dismissed her as "charming, simply charming, but quite a child", reminded her father, in The Seven Dials Mystery, that "she is no longer a child. She is a very charming and talented woman"; and, of course, by then, Lomax wished to marry her. Bundle's role was, in any case, more central in Seven Dials; despite Battle's crucial contribution, she was clearly the heroine and intended to be so.

Wodehousian comparisons
Several commentators have drawn parallels between the Chimneys novels, with their light hearted banter and amusing characters, and those of the humorist P. G. Wodehouse, of whom Agatha Christie was a great admirer. Christie herself described The Seven Dials Mystery as "the light-hearted thriller type". Lord Caterham was in the mould of eccentric Wodehousian peers, such as the Earl of Emsworth, who was also the ninth of his line; Bill Eversleigh has been described as "an amiable if vacuous young man who has staggered in from a Wodehouse novel"; while Bundle herself could easily have been one of Wodehouse's feisty young women, the archetype of which, Bobbie Wickham, first appeared in Mr Mulliner Speaking in 1929. There was even an aunt, Marcia, Dowager Marchioness of Caterham, who, having thought Bundle lived largely for pleasure, nevertheless recognised (as did George Lomax) her potential as a political hostess. In this context, Aunt Agatha's aspirations for Bertie Wooster in the Wodehouse books have a certain resonance, while Lord Caterham's ready acceptance of Eversleigh's golfing credentials matched Lord Emsworth's preference for young people who showed interest in his pigs.

Television and stage 
A dramatisation of The Seven Dials Mystery was broadcast by London Weekend Television in 1980, with Cheryl Campbell (born 1949) in the role of Bundle Brent. This production was, with LWT's Why Didn't They Ask Evans? and Partners in Crime, in the vanguard of a resurgence of classic crime fiction on British television in the 1980s.

At Christmas 2010 ITV broadcast an adaptation of The Secret of Chimneys, set in 1955 (but harking back to a ball in 1932), which, unlike the novel, imported Christie's perennial Miss Marple (Julia McKenzie) and made a number of other changes. Dervla Kirwan, in her late thirties, played Bundle, who, though still the daughter of Lord Caterham, was cast as the sister of 23-year-old Lady Virginia Revel (Charlotte Salt), an unrelated character in the original story. Of the two, Lady Virginia appeared to have more in common with the Bundle of the novels. The Radio Times observed that this production was "classic Agatha Christie, even though it's only distantly related to her original ... purists will be utterly flummoxed - and the plot has more holes in it than the murder victim".

An audiobook of The Seven Dials Mystery, read by Emilia Fox, was released in 2005, while Christie's stage play, Chimneys, which she wrote in 1931, eventually received its premiere at Pitlochry, Scotland in 2006. In the latter production, Bundle was played by Michele Gallagher.

Notes

Female characters in literature
Fictional British people
Literary characters introduced in 1925
Brent, Bundle